Jovellanos is a municipality and town in the Matanzas Province of Cuba.

Overview
The municipality is divided into the barrios of Asunción, Isabel, Realengo and San José.

It was founded in 1842 as Corral de la Bemba on the location of an old ranch called Bemba. It took its current name in 1870, in honor of the Spanish writer Gaspar Melchor de Jovellanos. The same year it achieved the status of villa (town).

Jovellanos is also called "Bemba" by its inhabitants and locals.  "Bemba" means "big lip" in Cuban Spanish; this term refers to the black population of the city.  To outsiders, it may have negative racial overtones, but in the city this is not the case.  Inside Jovellanos, the black and white population for the most part live harmoniously, side by side. Therefore, "Bemba" is an affectionate name for the town used by locals.

Jovellanos is an industrial town, with large and small factories, while sugar cane is cultivated in the surrounding areas.

Demographics
In 2004, the municipality of Jovellanos had a population of 58,685.

Notable people
 

Manuel Navarro Luna (1894–1966), Cuban poet and journalist

See also

Municipalities of Cuba
List of cities in Cuba

References

External links

Populated places in Matanzas Province